George Kuprejanov (6 March 1938 – 1991), was a Canadian chess International Master (IM) (1972).

Biography
George Kuprejanov was born in Yugoslavia. He was participant of the Yugoslav Chess Championship in 1962 and the International Chess tournament in Zagreb (1964).
In the second half of the 1960s George Kuprejanov moved to Canada. He won Toronto Chess Championship in 1971 (together with Géza Füster). George Kuprejanov participated many times in Canadian Chess Championships and achieved the best result in 1972, when he shared 2nd place with Lawrence Day (tournament won Peter Biyiasas).

George Kuprejanov played for Canada in the Chess Olympiad: 
 In 1974, at fourth board in the 21st Chess Olympiad in Nice (+6, =5, -3).

In 1972, George Kuprejanov was awarded the FIDE International Master (IM) title.

His articles have been published in Chess Canada - the FIDE area newsletter for the Chess Federation of Canada.

References

External links

George Kuprejanov chess games at 365chess.com

1938 births
1991 deaths
Sportspeople from Pančevo
Yugoslav chess players
Canadian chess players
Chess International Masters
Chess Olympiad competitors
20th-century chess players